The 2009–10 Azerbaijan Premier League was the eighteenth season of top-tier football in Azerbaijan. It began on 14 August 2009 and finished in May 2010. FK Baku were the defending champions.

The league was competed in two stages. The first stage consisted of a regular home-and-away round-robin schedule for a total of 22 matches per team. The competition then split into two halves. However, each team took over to the respective group only records earned against the remaining 5 teams in their second round group. The teams ranked first through sixth played out the championship and the European spots while the bottom six teams had to avoid one of the two relegation places.

Teams
MOIK Baku and Bakili Baku were relegated after finishing the 2008–09 season in the bottom two places. Since the Association of Football Federations of Azerbaijan did not grant a Premier League license to any of the teams in the Azerbaijan First Division, the league size was reduced to twelve teams.

Stadia and locations

Personnel and sponsoring

Managerial changes

First round

League table

Results

Second round

Championship group

Relegation group

Season statistics

Top scorers

Hat-tricks

 4 Player scored 4 goals

Scoring
 First goal of the season: Oleg Gvelesiani own goal for Mughan against Standard Baku (14 August 2009) 
 Fastest goal of the season: 1st minute, 
Allan Lalín for Khazar Lankaran against Standard Baku (17 October 2009)
Jabá for Baku against Inter Baku (4 April 2010)
 Latest goal of the season: 95th minute, 
Tomasz Stolpa for Gabala against Neftchi Baku (3 April 2010)
 Largest winning margin: 6 goals
Standard Baku 6–0 Karvan (9 May 2010) 
 Highest scoring game: 7 goals
Mughan 1–6 Inter Baku (18 October 2010)
Standard Baku 3–4 Baku (5 December 2009)
 Most goals scored in a match by a single team: 6 goals
Standard Baku 6–0 Karvan (9 May 2010)
Mughan 1–6 Inter Baku (18 October 2010)
 Most goals scored in a match by a losing team: 3 goals
Standard Baku 3–4 Baku (5 December 2009)

Clean sheets
 Most clean sheets: 17
Neftchi Baku
 Fewest clean sheets: 5
Mughan

Awards

Monthly awards

References

Azerbaijan Premier League seasons
Azer
1